The Order of the Holy Trinity is an Ethiopian house order, established by Haile Selassie I on 2 November 1930, to celebrate his coronation. It currently ranks as the fourth highest award in the Ethiopian order of precedence.

History
Haile Selassie established the Order of the Holy Trinity on 2 November 1930, as a way to celebrate his coronation as Emperor of Ethiopia following the death of Empress Zewditu on 2 April. Initially established in five grades, it was only awarded to a select group of Ethiopian aristocracy, high-ranking clergy, and senior members of the Imperial Court. Eventually, the order was slimmed down to one grade, Grand Cross (with an additional Grand Collar to denote exceptionally extraordinary service), and made available to foreigners, both civilian and military. Following the fall of the Ethiopian monarchy in 1975, the Order of the Holy Trinity remained present in the Ethiopian honors system, under the custody of the Crown Council. The current Grand Master of the order is Prince Ermias Sahle Selassie, grandson of Haile Selassie, and current president of the Crown Council.

Insignia

The badge and breast star of the Order of the Holy Trinity are both circular bronze-gilt medallions, bearing the points of a cross fleury. On the face of each medallion is an enamel trilobe emblem, divided by a forked cross, with each lobe depicting an image of (counterclockwise from the top) God the Father, God the Son, or God the Holy Spirit. Circumscribing the inner emblem is an Amharic phrase, written using Ge'ez script. For the badge of the order, the entire medallion is suspended from the sash by a bronze-gilt Ethiopian Imperial crown.

Notable recipients
 Abdul Haris Nasution
 Amha Selassie
 Desta Damtew
 George Mikhailovich of Russia
 Haile Selassie
 Konrad Adenauer
 Prince Makonnen
 Addison E. Southard
 Maxwell D. Taylor
 Seyum Mangasha
 William Westmoreland
 Zera Yacob Amha Selassie

See also
 Emperor of Ethiopia
 Solomonic dynasty

References

Solomon
Orders, decorations, and medals of Ethiopia
Awards established in 1930
1930 establishments in Ethiopia